The 2014 División Profesional season (officially the 2014 Copa TIGO- Visión Banco for sponsorship reasons) was the 80th season of top-flight professional football in Paraguay.

Teams

Torneo Apertura
The Campeonato de Apertura, also the Copa TIGO-Visión Banco for sponsorship reasons, was the 110º official championship of the Primera División, called "Dr. Nicolás Leoz, Centenario del club 12 de Octubre", and is the first championship of the 2014 season. It began on February 14 and will end on June 29.

Standings

Results

Top scorers

Source: Soccerway

Torneo Clausura
The Campeonato de Clausura, also the Copa TIGO-Visión Banco for sponsorship reasons, will be the 111º official championship of the Primera División, and was the second championship of the 2014 season.

Standings

Results

Top scorers

Aggregate table
In 2014, Paraguay have seven slots in international cups (three in the Copa Libertadores de America and four in the Copa Sudamericana). These seven slots will be filled by five teams.
For the 2015 Copa Libertadores, the champions of the Apertura and Clausura tournaments qualify automatically. The third representative (going into the first round play-off) is the best placed non-champion from the cumulative table of both the Apertura and Clausura.
For the 2015 Copa Sudamericana, the champion (Apertura or Clausura) with the better Apertura and Clausura cumulatives qualify, with the 4th, 5th, 6th best placed teams from the Apertura and Clausura cumulatives.

Relegation
Relegations is determined at the end of the season by computing an average of the number of points earned per game over the past three seasons. The two teams with the lowest average are relegated to the División Intermedia for the following season. 
 Source: D10 Paraguay

See also
2014 in Paraguayan football

References

External links
APF's official website 
2014 season on RSSSF

Paraguay
1
Paraguayan Primera División seasons